George Thomas Morgan (June 28, 1924 – July 7, 1975) was a mid-20th-century American country music singer. He is a member of the Country Music Hall of Fame and a former member of the Grand Ole Opry. He is best known for his 1949 hit single "Candy Kisses". He is the father of singer Lorrie Morgan, who is also a country music star.

Biography
Morgan was born to Zachariah "Zach" Morgan and Ethel Turner in Waverly, Tennessee, United States, but was raised in Barberton, Ohio. He was, along with a few other contemporaries (most notably Eddy Arnold and Jim Reeves), referred to as a "country crooner;" his singing style being more similar to that of Bing Crosby or Perry Como than that of Ernest Tubb or Lefty Frizzell.

Morgan was a member of the Grand Ole Opry since 1948, and is best remembered for the Columbia Records song "Candy Kisses", which was a No. 1 hit on the Billboard country music chart for three weeks in 1949. He also had several hits based on a "rose" theme: "Room Full of Roses", "Red Roses for a Blue Lady", and "Red Roses From the Blue Side of Town". His version of "Almost" (1952), written by Vic McAlpin and Jack Toombs, was Morgan's second million selling record. In the early 1950s he hosted a 15-minute radio program syndicated nationally by RadiOzark Enterprises in Springfield, Missouri.

In 1974, Morgan was the last person to sing on the stage of the Ryman Auditorium, before the Grand Ole Opry moved to the new Grand Ole Opry House. A week later, he was the first to sing on stage at the venue.

Death 
He died in 1975 of a heart attack after undergoing open heart surgery, and was interred in the Spring Hill Cemetery in Madison, Tennessee.

Personal life 
His daughter, country music singer Lorrie Morgan, released two songs as duets with her late father dubbed in: "I'm Completely Satisfied" (1979) and "From This Moment On" (2006).

Discography

Albums

Singles

A"Room Full of Roses" also peaked at No. 25 on the Billboard Hot 100.

References

External links
[ Allmusic]
Morgan's Country Music Hall of Fame and Museum page

1924 births
1975 deaths
Country Music Hall of Fame inductees
American country singer-songwriters
People from Waverly, Tennessee
American people of Welsh descent
Grand Ole Opry members
Columbia Records artists
Starday Records artists
Place of death missing
Burials in Tennessee
20th-century American singers
Singer-songwriters from Tennessee
People from Doylestown, Ohio
Country musicians from Tennessee
Country musicians from Ohio
Singer-songwriters from Ohio